Patricia Farley (born June 1974) is a former member of the Nevada Senate, representing the 8th district from 2014 until 2018. She was first elected to the chamber as a Republican, but switched her partisan registration to Nonpartisan in 2016.

Early life and career
Farley announced shortly after the November 2016 general election that she would change her party affiliation from Republican to nonpartisan with the intention of caucusing with Democrats.

Electoral history
Farley was first elected in 2014, defeating Democrat Marilyn Dondero Loop and Independent Jon Kamerath with Farley receiving 57% of the votes.

References 

1974 births
Living people
Politicians from Mesa, Arizona
Women state legislators in Nevada
Nevada state senators
21st-century American politicians
21st-century American women politicians
Nevada Republicans
Nevada Independents